Big Ron may refer to:

 Big Ron Studd, American professional wrestler
 Big Ron Harris, American professional wrestler
 Big Ron (EastEnders), soap opera character
 A nickname for former football player and manager Ron Atkinson